Key lime pie is an American dessert pie. It is made of lime juice, egg yolks, and sweetened condensed milk. It may be served with no topping, topped with a meringue topping made from egg whites, or with whipped cream; it may be cooked in a pie crust, graham cracker crust, or no crust. The dish is named after the small Key limes, which are more aromatic than the common Persian limes, and which have yellow juice. The filling in a Key lime pie is typically yellow because of the egg yolks.

The filling is made similarly to a Magic Lemon cream pie, by simply mixing the ingredients without cooking: the proteins of the egg yolks and condensed milk and the acidic lime juice curdle, thickening the mixture without baking. Today, Key lime pies are usually baked to pasteurize the eggs and thicken the filling further.

History

Key lime pie is probably derived from the "Magic Lemon Cream Pie" published in a promotional brochure by Borden, a producer of condensed milk, in 1931. The recipe is attributed to Borden's fictional spokesperson, Jane Ellison, and includes condensed milk, lemon juice and rind, and egg yolks. It is covered with meringue, baked, and served cold. According to the pastry chef Stella Parks, users of the recipe altered it with local ingredients; she describes it as "a stunning reminder of how deeply America's traditions are shaped by advertising". 

A "Tropical Lime Chiffon Pie", using condensed milk and egg yolks, is documented in a 1933 Miami newspaper article. An "icebox lime pie", was mentioned as a specialty of the Florida Keys in 1935. and a recipe under the name "Key Lime Pie" was published in 1940.

No earlier solid sources are known, despite appeals to the public. A 1927 Key West Women's Club cookbook does not mention the recipe. A 1926 restaurant menu includes "lime pie", but it is unclear what it was. Various accounts claim that it was known earlier, but none were recorded before 1933. A widely-reported story claims that William Curry's cook Aunt Sally invented it in the late 19th century. But there is no evidence for this, and the oldest version of this story dates to only 1895, in promotional materials for a Bed and Breakfast in Curry's former house.

It was in the 1950s that Key lime pie was promoted as Florida's "most famous treat" and in 1987 as "the greatest of all regional American desserts."

Key limes

Key lime (Citrus aurantifolia 'Swingle') is naturalized throughout the Florida Keys. While their thorns make them less tractable, and their thin, yellow rinds more perishable, Key limes are more tart and more aromatic than the common Persian limes seen year-round at grocery stores in the United States. Key limes have not been grown commercially in the U.S. since the 1926 Miami hurricane; they are generally imported from Central or South America. Key lime juice, unlike regular lime juice, is a pale yellow.   Bottled Key lime juice, invariably from concentrate, is widely available at retail in the United States.

Legislation
	
Florida State Representative Bernie Papy, Jr. is said to have introduced geographical indication legislation in 1965 calling for a $100 fine to be levied against anyone advertising Key lime pie not made with Key limes. The bill failed.

Florida statute 15.052, passed in July 2006, designates Key lime pie "the official Florida state pie".

See also

Cream pie
Lemon meringue pie
Lemon pie
Lime
Pavlova (food)

References

American pies
Cuisine of the Southern United States
Fruit pies
Florida cuisine
Culture of Key West, Florida
Citrus dishes
Limes (fruit)
Symbols of Florida